Claudia Malzahn (born 23 August 1983 in Halle/Saale) is a German judoka. At the 2012 Summer Olympics she competed in the Women's 63 kg, but was defeated in the first round.

References

External links
 
 
 

German female judoka
Living people
Olympic judoka of Germany
Judoka at the 2012 Summer Olympics
1983 births
21st-century German women